Mega Man: The Power Battle is an arcade video game and a spin-off title for the Mega Man series. It was released in Japan in 1995 and was followed by a sequel, Mega Man 2: The Power Fighters, the following year. Both games—which were the first and only arcade titles ever to exist within the Mega Man franchise—were ported to home consoles in North America in 2004 as part of the Mega Man Anniversary Collection for PlayStation 2, Nintendo GameCube and Xbox and in Japan during the same year as part of two game compilation titled , also for the PlayStation 2. An adaptation of both games for the Neo Geo Pocket Color, titled , was also made. Both games were later re-released as part of the Capcom Arcade 2nd Stadium compilation in 2022.

Plot
The story of the game is simplistic; the evil Doctor Wily has rebuilt some of his Robot Masters, with which he is trying to take over the world, forcing the heroes to stop him.

Gameplay

The game allows the player to choose between three playable characters: Mega Man, Proto Man, and Bass. Two players can play the game simultaneously as different characters and team up to defeat the bosses.

The game plays similarly to the main Mega Man games - the player uses one button to jump, and one to fire the character's arm-mounted energy weapon. Holding the fire button charges the weapon in order to release a stronger blast. Holding down while pressing the jump button makes the character perform a dash, the appearance of which varies between characters.

After selecting a character, the player chooses between three "stories", with each one having different Robot Masters from various games. The "stories" are Mega Man 1-2, 3-6, and Mega Man 7. Upon choosing a "story", the game quickly pans through the various levels, letting the player choose one roulette-style.

A level is largely different from the mainstream Mega Man games; instead of going through an entire stage and fighting the Robot Master as a boss at the end, the player faces the Robot Master immediately, in a fight reminiscent of Capcom's Street Fighter series. Defeating a Robot Master earns the player their weapon, which can be switched to by pressing a button. Like in most Mega Man games, each Robot Master is weak to another one's weapon, so the player can fight through them in a "rock-paper-scissors"-style.

Music 

The  sound track was released on December 1, 1995 in Japan Sony Records. Its soundtrack contains arranged pieces from previous Mega Man games by Setsuo Yamamoto and Hideki Okugawa, and performed by Alph-Lyla.

Reception

Four reviewers for the Japanese publication Weekly Famitsu scored the PlayStation 2 compilation of the games a total of 22 out of 40.

References

External links
Rockman: Power Battle Fighters official website 

1995 video games
Arcade video games
CP System II games
Fighting games
Multiplayer and single-player video games
Video games developed in Japan
Power Battle